is a Japanese voice actress. She was born in Hyōgo, and works for Aoni Production.

Notable voice roles

Anime

Blue Gender (Alicia Whistle)
Boogiepop Phantom (Akane Kojima)
Gakuen Alice (Ruka Nogi)
Hand Maid May (Ikariya, Masato Zin)
Kanon (Yuichi Aizawa (child))
Kidou Shinsengumi Moeyo Ken (Seiryu)

Game

Kidou Shinsengumi Moeyo Ken (Seiryu)
King of Fighters: Maximum Impact (Mignon Beart)
Rune Factory 2 (Alicia)

References

External links
Miwa Yasuda at Aoni Production
 
Miwa Yasuda at Ryu's Seiyuu Infos

1977 births
Living people
Voice actresses from Hyōgo Prefecture
Japanese video game actresses
Japanese voice actresses
20th-century Japanese actresses
21st-century Japanese actresses
Aoni Production voice actors